Bruno Afonso David Fernandes, also known as Bruno Fernando (born August 15, 1998), is an Angolan professional basketball player for the Atlanta Hawks of the National Basketball Association (NBA). He played college basketball for the Maryland Terrapins.

High school career
A native of Luanda, Angola, Bruno Fernando started playing basketball in his hometown. While playing the 2014 FIBA Under-17 World Championship with the Angolan national team, he caught the eye of scouts in the US. In early 2015, he joined the Montverde Academy in Montverde, Florida. He committed to Southern Methodist University in April 2016 but decided the following month to reclassify into the Class of 2017. He spent the 2016–17 season at IMG Academy in Bradenton, Florida. In October 2016, Bruno Fernando committed to the University of Maryland, after also considering Auburn, Alabama, and Florida State, among others.

College career
Fernando made his debut for Maryland on November 10, 2017, against Stony Brook. Coming off the bench, he scored ten points to go along with two rebounds, one assist, one block, and one steal in 13 minutes of playing time. He was named Big Ten Freshman of the Week on January 8, 2018, after posting 17 points and 11 rebounds against Penn State and a career-high 21 points in a 91–73 win versus Iowa. He had a strong freshman season as he averaged 10.3 points, 6.5 rebounds, and 1.2 blocks per game, and earned All-Big Ten Freshman honors. After the season, Fernando declared for the 2018 NBA draft and participated in the NBA Draft Combine that year, but withdrew from the draft and returned to Maryland.

Professional career

Atlanta Hawks (2019–2021)
Fernando was selected as the 34th pick of the 2019 NBA draft by the Philadelphia 76ers. Fernando became the first Angolan player to be selected in the NBA draft. He was traded to the Atlanta Hawks. On July 7, 2019, the Hawks announced that they had signed Fernando. On October 24, 2019, Fernando made his debut in NBA, coming off from bench in a 117–100 win over the Detroit Pistons with seven points, three rebounds and two assists. He received his first assignment to the Hawks’ NBA G League affiliate, the College Park Skyhawks, on November 25. He made his G League debut that evening. Fernando missed several games in January 2020 due to the death of his mother.

On June 20, 2021, Fernando was suspended for one game without pay for leaving the bench during an altercation between the Hawks and the Philadelphia 76ers.

Boston Celtics (2021–2022)
On August 7, 2021, Fernando was traded to the Boston Celtics in a three-team trade involving the Sacramento Kings. On November 19, 2021, Fernando made his debut with the Maine Celtics scoring four points and shooting 100% from the field.

Houston Rockets (2022–2023)
On February 10, 2022, the Houston Rockets acquired Fernando, Enes Freedom, and Dennis Schröder from the Boston Celtics in exchange for Daniel Theis. 

On July 26, 2022, Fernando re-signed with the Rockets in a two-way deal. On October 2, the Rockets converted his two-way contract into a four-year, $10.9 million deal. On October 19, he had his first start on the team with a seven-point, nine-rebound, and seven-assist performance in a 117–107 loss to the Atlanta Hawks.

Return to Atlanta (2023–present)
On February 9, 2023, Fernando and Garrison Mathews were traded to the Atlanta Hawks in exchange for Justin Holiday, Frank Kaminsky and 2 future second-round draft picks.

National team career
Participating in the 2014 FIBA Under-17 World Championship in Dubai, he averaged 9.1 points, 10.6 rebounds, and 2.7 blocks per contest for the Angolan national team. In 2016, Bruno Fernando made his debut with Angola's men's national team and participated in the FIBA Olympic Qualifying Tournament in Belgrade. Averaging 18.3 points, 6.6 boards, 2.1 assists, and 1.6 blocks per game, he led Angola to gold at the 2016 FIBA Africa Under-18 Championship, while receiving Afrobasket.com All-African Championships U18 Best Player honors.

He later also joined the Angola senior team for the 2018 Olympic Qualifiers. He did not play for his country for four years, until returning in August 2022 for Angola's World Cup qualifiers.

Career statistics

NBA

Regular season

|-
| style="text-align:left;"|
| style="text-align:left;"|Atlanta
| 56 || 13 || 12.7 || .518 || .135 || .569 || 3.5 || .9 || .3 || .3 || 4.3
|-
| style="text-align:left;"|
| style="text-align:left;"|Atlanta
| 33 || 0 || 6.8 || .409 || .000 || .682 || 2.4 || .3 || .1 || .1 || 1.5
|-
| style="text-align:left;"|
| style="text-align:left;"|Boston
| 20 || 0 || 2.9 || .500 || 1.000 || .800 || .8 || .2 || .0 || .2 || 1.0
|-
| style="text-align:left;"|
| style="text-align:left;"|Houston
| 10 || 0 || 9.4 || .707 || .000 || .579 || 4.0 || .3 || .1 || .8 || 6.9
|-
| style="text-align:left;"|
| style="text-align:left;"|Houston
| 31 || 4 || 11.7 || .516 || .000 || .682 || 3.9 || 1.0 || .2 || 1.0 || 4.1
|- class="sortbottom"
| style="text-align:center;" colspan="2"|Career
| 150 || 17 || 9.7 || .524 || .143 || .631 || 3.0 || .6 || .2 || .4 || 3.4

Playoffs

|-
| style="text-align:left;"| 2021
| style="text-align:left;"| Atlanta
| 6 || 0 || 2.0 || .667 || — || 1.000 || .2 || 0.0 || 0.0 || 0.0 || 1.0
|- class="sortbottom"
| style="text-align:center;" colspan="2"| Career
| 6 || 0 || 2.0 || .667 || — || 1.000 || .2 || 0.0 || 0.0 || 0.0 || 1.0

College

|-
| style="text-align:left;"| 2017–18
| style="text-align:left;"| Maryland
| 30 || 20 || 22.4 || .578 || .333 || .740 || 6.6 || .7 || .4 || 1.2 || 10.3
|-
| style="text-align:left;"| 2018–19
| style="text-align:left;"| Maryland
| 34 || 33 || 30.0 || .607 || .300 || .779 || 10.6 || 2.0 || .6 || 1.9 || 13.6
|- class="sortbottom"
| style="text-align:center;" colspan="2"| Career
| 64 || 53 || 26.4 || .595 || .308 || .763 || 8.7 || 1.4 || .5 || 1.6 || 12.0

References

External links
 Maryland Terrapins bio
 FIBA profile

1998 births
Living people
Angolan expatriate basketball people in the United States
Angolan men's basketball players
Atlanta Hawks players
Basketball players from Luanda
Boston Celtics players
College Park Skyhawks players
Houston Rockets players
Maine Celtics players
Maryland Terrapins men's basketball players
Montverde Academy alumni
Philadelphia 76ers draft picks
Power forwards (basketball)